Moss James Burmester (born 19 June 1981) is a New Zealand swimmer and diver. His specialist event is the 200m butterfly in which he holds the Commonwealth record of 1:54.35 set at the 2008 Summer Olympics.

Burmester was born in Hastings, New Zealand. He grew up in Tauranga and received his education at Otumoetai College. His career highlights in the 200m butterfly are 4th at the 2008 Olympics and gold medallist at the 2006 Commonwealth Games in Melbourne where he set a Commonwealth Games record of 1:56.64.

He was the bronze medallist in the 100m butterfly at the 2006 Commonwealth Games with a time of 52.73 and set a New Zealand record of 52.37 when qualifying for New Zealand's 2008 Olympic team.

After he retired from swimming, he became an unassisted diver.

Career highlights

2008 Olympics
In the 200m butterfly final, Burmester led for the first 50m, slipped to second behind Michael Phelps for the middle 100m and finished 4th equal, setting a Commonwealth record of 1:54.35.

2006 Commonwealth Games
1st: 200 m butterfly (1:56.64 – Games record)
3rd: 100 m butterfly (52.73)

2004 Olympic Games
28th 400 m freestyle (3:57.29)
28th 1500 m freestyle (15:56.42)
12th: 200 m butterfly (1:58.09)

2002 Commonwealth Games
18th: 100 m freestyle (53.21)
16th: 50 m butterfly (25.50)
9th: 100 m butterfly (54.96)
4th: 200 m butterfly (1:59.94)

See also
 Commonwealth Games records in swimming

References

External links
 Moss Burmester's official website 
 Moss Burmester, SPARC (Sport & Recreation New Zealand)
 Moss takes first gold medal
 
 
 
 
 
 

1981 births
Living people
New Zealand male butterfly swimmers
Olympic swimmers of New Zealand
Commonwealth Games gold medallists for New Zealand
Commonwealth Games bronze medallists for New Zealand
Swimmers at the 2004 Summer Olympics
Swimmers at the 2008 Summer Olympics
Swimmers at the 2002 Commonwealth Games
Swimmers at the 2006 Commonwealth Games
Sportspeople from Hastings, New Zealand
Medalists at the FINA World Swimming Championships (25 m)
Commonwealth Games medallists in swimming
People educated at Otumoetai College
Medallists at the 2006 Commonwealth Games